Heritage is 1920 American silent drama film directed by William L. Roubert and starring his son Matty Roubert and Herbert Standing.

Cast
Matty Roubert as Jit
Herbert Standing as Charles Suydam
Augusta Perry as Mrs. Suydam
Joseph Burke as Edward Brackett
Phil Sanford as Tony (credited as Philip Sanford)
Adelaide Fitz-Allen as Tony's Mother (credited as Adelaide Fitzallen)

Preservation status
A print of Heritage is preserved in the Library of Congress collection.

References

External links

1920 films
American silent feature films
Films based on short fiction
American black-and-white films
Silent American drama films
1920 drama films
1920s American films